Luo Yunxi (born 28 July 1988), also known by his English name Leo Luo, is a Chinese actor, singer, dancer who predominantly works in Chinese television drama industry. He graduated from the Shanghai Theater Academy where he majored in ballet.

Luo became known for his role as the younger counterpart of the male protagonist He Yichen in the hit romance drama My Sunshine. He achieved breakthrough with the fantasy romance drama Ashes of Love, where his role as an ambiguous antagonist received critical and popular acclaim.

Early life and education
Luo Yunxi, born Luo Yi (罗弋), was raised in Chengdu, Sichuan, China. When he was three, his father, who was a dance teacher, discovered his talent and started to teach him dancing. Luo was trained professionally in ballet for 11 years. In 2005, Luo was admitted to both Beijing Dance Academy and Shanghai Theater Academy, and chose to enter the latter. In 2008, Luo and his classmates participated in the sixth Lotus Award National College Dance Competition in China and performed the group ballet dance “Tchaikovsky Rhapsody”. As a part of the competition, Luo also performed a single impromptu solo “The Burning Flame”. The “Tchaikovsky Rhapsody” group ballet dance received the golden medal of the competition.

After graduation, he worked as an instructor at the School of Dance of Macao Conservatory. During this time, he participated in the stage performance of the contemporary ballet “Flying to the Moon” and served as one of the lead dancers. The dancing drama was selected to be performed during the celebration of tenth anniversary of Macau's transfer of sovereignty in 2009.

Career

2010–2013: Singing and acting debut
In 2010, Luo debuted as part of the three-member boy group JBOY3 with the single "Promise of Love". The group released its second single “Gravity”  on March 23, 2011, and the third single ”Walking Emoji”  on July 26, 2011. JBOY3 disbanded in 2012.

Luo then teamed up with one of the members Fu Longfei to form a duo named Double JL (双孖JL), and they released the single "JL" in April 2012 and the second single "Us" in August 2012. As a group, Double JL participated in various activities; including auditioning for the singing reality competition show Asian Wave, and hosting an internet variety show Music ShowShowShow from December 2012 to March 2013. They also participated in a few television gala events, such as 2013 Sichuan TV New Year Gala Concert and Shanghai Dragon TV New Year Gala Concert.
Double JL disbanded in 2013.

Luo made his acting debut in 2012, when he was cast in the romance film The Spring of My Life opposite Tan Songyun. The film was released in theaters in 2015. In 2013, he was cast in his first drama Flip in Summer, which was broadcast in 2018.

2014–2017: Solo activities and Rising popularity
In 2014, Luo starred in the science fiction campus web drama  Hello Aliens. The same year, he signed a contract with the agency Lafeng Entertainment.

In 2015, Luo became known to audiences with his role as the younger counterpart of the male protagonist He Yichen (played by Wallace Chung) in the hit romance drama My Sunshine. Following the airing of the drama, Luo experienced a significant rise in popularity.

In 2016, Luo was cast as the protagonist Qin Ming in the crime suspense drama Voice of the Dead, an adaption of one of the books in the Medical Examiner Dr. Qin novel series. The same year, he starred in historical fantasy drama Fox in the Screen as a fox demon in love with a human.

In 2017, Luo co-starred in the fantasy romance drama A Life Time Love where he reunited with My Sunshine co-star Janice Wu. He then played the lead role in the medical drama Children's Hospital Pediatrician. He also voiced the role of Flame in the animated film Dragon Force, which was released in September 2017.

2018–present: Breakthrough
In 2018, Luo began filming the historical romance drama Princess Silver as a kind but distant and misunderstood prince who inherits a deadly poison from his mother before birth. The drama was released in April 2019.

Luo also starred in the hit fantasy romance drama Ashes of Love as Runyu, the gentle and regal Night Immortal whose innocence and kindness later transforms into hatred and revenge when he sets out to avenge his mother's unfair death. The drama topped television ratings and was one of the most watched dramas online, and Luo's portrayal of a morally ambiguous antagonist received critical acclaim and led to widespread recognition for him. The same year, he was cast in the modern romance drama Broker alongside Victoria Song as a morally ambiguous corporate spy with a hidden motive. The drama premiered on Zhejiang TV and Jiangsu TV on July 22, 2021.

In 2020, Luo was cast in the xianxia drama Immortality as the selfless and fearless grandmaster Chu Wanning. The same year, he starred in the wuxia romance drama And The Winner Is Love as Shangguan Tou, the graceful young master of the Yueshang Valley. He also starred in the modern romance workplace drama Love is Sweet，and received positive reviews for his role as an arrogant and charming investment bank executive. The same year, he was cast as the secretive CEO Li Zeliang in melo romance Lie to Love.

In 2021, Luo was cast in Light Chaser Rescue as an unscrupulous lawyer who turns over a new leaf after becoming a volunteer rescue worker. This drama marks his third collaboration with My Sunshine co-star Janice Wu. He was also cast in upcoming xianxia drama Till The End Of The Moon as Tantai Jin, a hostage prince who is born with an evil bone and must rebel against his destiny of becoming the havoc-wreaking Demon God.

In 2022, Luo was cast in medical romance drama Love Is Panacea as the genius neurosurgeon Gu Yunzheng, who ends up spearheading research on Huntington's disease to save his love interest.

Filmography

Film

Television series

Variety show

Reality show

Discography

Albums

Singles

Awards and nominations

Ballet Awards

References

External links
 Luo Yunxi’s Weibo

1988 births
Living people
Male actors from Chengdu
Singers from Chengdu
Shanghai Theatre Academy alumni
21st-century Chinese male actors
Chinese male television actors
21st-century Chinese male singers